White Men Can't Jump is a basketball video game developed by High Voltage Software and published by Atari Corporation exclusively for the Atari Jaguar on August 1, 1995. It is loosely based on the 20th Century Fox's 1992 film of the same name.

Featuring arcade-style gameplay but closely following the rules seen in street basketball as with the film, players compete with either CPU-controlled opponents or against other players in matches across various locations set in Los Angeles. Plans for an adaptation of the movie in video game form began in 1993, when a licensing agreement between 20th Century Fox and Trimark Interactive took place, with the latter obtaining the rights to the movie after the deal was realized. White Men Can't Jump became the first title on the Jaguar in featuring support for the Team Tap adapter, which was bundled along with the game, allowing more than two players to participate in tandem.

White Men Can't Jump received mixed to negative reception from reviewers since its release, with criticism geared towards the poor graphics, sound department and controls, though its multiplayer feature was complimented by critics. Retrospective reviews panned it as one of the worst games of all time.

Gameplay 

White Men Can't Jump is a two-on-two street basketball game similar to Barkley Shut Up and Jam! and Jammit, where players take control of either of the fourteen teams available, each one composed of two basketball players for a total of twenty-eight playable characters to choose from in a series of matches on outdoor courts across different locations taking place in the Los Angeles area, with the exception of Inglewood Forum, which takes place on an indoor court and only available in Tournament mode. Though similar to NBA Jam in terms of gameplay and controls, the game provides a faster and more aggressive pace, as it contains less basketball play regulations and never penalizes any player, emulating the looser and rougher nature of urban basketball. The court locations do not have any effect during gameplay, but each of the playable characters has a unique set of status skills, encouraging players to figure out which character fits their play style the best.

During gameplay, players can pass, fake a pass, jump, shoot, dunk, and punch to try knocking down an opponent. Players can use a turbo ability by using extra energy and the more energy a player has, the more likely they are to pull off a "Super Dunk" at a distance from the basket. Each character can pull off a variety of "Super Dunks". Players can also switch between both characters on their team when using an AI teammate.

Modes 
White Men Can't Jump only offers two different modes of play: Versus and Tournament. Versus is a pick-up and play mode where up to four players can take part in individual two-on-two street basketball games, with remaining players being controlled by AI. Tournament mode can be played by 1 or 2 players (on the same team), where each players start out with $500 and bet money on each game against CPU-controlled opponents and once players earn $5,000, they are entered into the Slam City Tournament but if the players fails to earn $5,000 amount over 30 games or loses all money, the game is over, though players can resume their progress by using "Keys" to return into the last game saved.

Development and release 
Plans for a video game adaptation of White Men Can't Jump were announced in August 1993, after an licensing agreement between 20th Century Fox and Trimark Interactive, which was a newly formed subsidiary by Trimark as one of their first releases across all platforms. Scott Corley, main programmer and one of the designers of Ruiner Pinball at High Voltage Software, recounted about the development process of the title for the Atari Jaguar in a thread at the 3DO Zone forums. He stated that High Voltage Software locally hired members from the acrobatic Jesse White Tumbling Team crew, who performed all of the moves seen in-game for the characters, which were filmed at a gym without the aid of blue screen, while the frames were then cut out and digitized by using Deluxe Paint. He also stated that the work also served as a learning exercise for their future projects involving motion capture, in addition of being a positive experience for the company. Scott also remarked that Adisak Pochanayon, who would later become the lead programmer of NBA Jam: Tournament Edition for the Jaguar, did most of the programming for the project and created the three-dimensional basketball courts through perspective correction, similar to Doom.

White Men Can't Jump was first showcased to the public in an early playable state during SCES '94, featuring a mostly different artwork compared to the final release but it only supported two players for versus matches, and was advertized in EGM2 for a Q1 1995 release. It was later showcased in a more advanced state during WCES '95 and Spring ECTS '95, now featuring support for up to four players and slated for an April 1995 release. The game made its last trade show appearance at E3 1995. It was also covered by the magazine press that were invited to Atari Corp.'s US and UK divisions.

Reception 

White Men Can't Jump received mostly mixed reviews. The two sports reviewers of Electronic Gaming Monthly panned the game, citing the confusing camera perspective, poor animation, blocky graphics, and ineffective control.

GamePro commented that "Poor control, bad graphics, and annoying sound make Atari's White Men Can't Jump the worst basketball experience since watching the Clippers." They particularly criticized that controls often fail to respond and shots tend to miss the hoop even when shot in the correct direction from right next to the basket.

A critic for Next Generation dissented with the majority opinion; while he said that the game occasionally suffers from erratic camera movements and requires multiple players to get full enjoyment out of it, he generally applauded White Men Can't Jump for its intense violence, "swooping" camera angles, sprite scaling, street-style audio commentary, and generally solid balance.

Patrick Baggatta of Game Players also said the game is much less enjoyable with fewer than four players, commenting that "When playing against the computer there's just a little too much that can't be controlled." He approved of how well the graphics and gameplay recreated the feel of street basketball, but felt the trash talking voice clips got annoying quickly and criticized the camera as moving around too frequently.

Electronic Gaming Monthlys Seanbaby placed it as number 8 in his "20 worst games of all time" feature.

References

External links 
 
 White Men Can't Jump at AtariAge
 White Men Can't Jump at GameFAQs
 White Men Can't Jump at MobyGames

1995 video games
Atari games
Atari Jaguar games
Atari Jaguar-only games
Basketball video games
High Voltage Software games
Multiplayer and single-player video games
Sports video games set in the United States
Trimark Interactive games
Video games based on films
Video games developed in the United States
Video games set in Los Angeles
Video games set in California
Video games with digitized sprites